Uthami Petra Rathinam is a 1960 Indian Tamil-language drama film directed by M. A. Thirumugam and written by Aaroor Dass. The film stars K. Balaji Malini and P. Kannamba, with T. K. Ramachandran, M. N. Rajam, Pandari Bai, S. V. Sahasranamam, Kuladeivam Rajagopal and Manorama in supporting roles. It was released on 1 April 1960.

Plot 
The story concerns the problems between the rich man and the poor and the rich man's daughter falling in love in with the poor boy, whose father works for the rich man. The other eye the property and the women and how these problems are solved.

Cast 
 K. Balaji
 Malini
 T. K. Ramachandran
 M. N. Rajam
 S. V. Sahasranamam
 P. Kannamba
S. V. Subbaiah
 Pandari Bai
 Nagesh
Kuladeivam Rajagopal
 Manorama
 P. D. Sambandam
 Sandow M. M. A. Chinnappa Thevar
 C. P. Kittan

Production 
The film was produced by Amara Productions and presented by Sandow M. M. A. Chinnappa Thevar, and directed by his brother M. A. Thirumugam. There was a dance sequence by a Sukumari.

Soundtrack 
Music was by T. Chalapathi Rao and lyrics were penned by Thanjai N. Ramaiah Dass, A. Maruthakasi and Subbu Arumugam.

Reception 
Film historian Randor Guy wrote in 2014, "In spite of the formidable cast, interesting onscreen narration and pleasing music, the film did not do well mainly because of the complicated and somewhat familiar storyline".

References

External links 
 

1960 drama films
1960 films
1960s Tamil-language films
Films directed by M. A. Thirumugam
Films scored by T. Chalapathi Rao
Indian black-and-white films
Indian drama films